The Book of Lists refers to any one of a series of books compiled by David Wallechinsky, his father  Irving Wallace  and sister Amy Wallace.

Each book contains hundreds of lists (many accompanied by textual explanations) on unusual or obscure topics, for example:
 Famous people who died during sexual intercourse
 The world's greatest libel suits
 People suspected of being Jack the Ripper
 Worst places to hitchhike
 Dr. Demento's 10 Worst Song Titles of All Time
 People misquoted by Ronald Reagan
 Breeds of dogs which bite people the most, and the least

The first Book of Lists was published in 1977, a second volume came out in 1980 and the third appeared in 1983. Book of Lists for the 1990s was published in 1993; yet another volume, The New Book of Lists, was published in 2005. The first volume was initially controversial and banned in some libraries and parts of the United States when it was published due to, among other things, a chapter that graphically described popular sexual positions and their pros and cons. The 2005 volume was essentially "new" in name only; it was made up primarily of reprinted and updated lists selected from the first three volumes, which have gone out of print.

Wallechinsky and Wallace  were also responsible for editing The People's Almanac, which covered similar ground, as well as The Book of Predictions. They also contributed a weekly column in Parade magazine.

Other authors who have followed this basic format include Russ Kick, author of The Disinformation Book of Lists, Louis Rukeyser, author of Louis Rukeyser's Book of Lists, and Bernard Schwartz with A Book of Legal Lists.

In 2005, a Canadian edition of The Book of Lists was published and credited to David Wallechinsky, Amy Wallace, Ira Basen and Jane Farrow. The book contained a mixture of content from the original three volumes, mixed in with updated material, and material with a specifically Canadian focus.

See also
The Infinity of Lists

References

Book series introduced in 1977
Almanacs
Trivia books
Books by Irving Wallace
Books by David Wallechinsky
Books by Amy Wallace
William Morrow and Company books
Reference works